Leucrocuta hebe is a species of flatheaded mayfly in the family Heptageniidae. It is found in southeastern, northern Canada, the northern, and southeastern United States.

References

External links

 

Mayflies
Articles created by Qbugbot
Insects described in 1924